Nagai (written: 永井 lit. eternal well or 長井 lit. "long well") is a Japanese surname. Notable people with the surname include:

, Japanese boxer
Go Nagai, Japanese manga artist
Hazuki Nagai (born 1994), Japanese field hockey player
, a member of K-Pop girl group, LIGHTSUM
Jordan Nagai (born 2000), American former voice actor
Jun Nagai (born 1944), Japanese middle-distance runner
Kafū Nagai, Japanese novelist, playwright, essayist, and diarist
Kenji Nagai, Japanese journalist, killed in Myanmar
Kensuke Nagai, Japanese footballer
Koji Nagai, Japanese businessman, CEO of Nomura Holdings
Michiko Nagai, Japanese writer
, Japanese mixed martial artist, kickboxer and professional wrestler
Ryo Nagai, Japanese footballer
, Japanese footballer
Takashi Nagai, Japanese radiologist and Catholic writer
Tatsuo Nagai, Japanese writer
Yasutomo Nagai (1965–1995), Japanese motorcycle racer
Yuri Nagai (born 1992), Japanese field hockey player

Japanese-language surnames